Separ may refer to:
Separ, New Mexico, an unincorporated community and ghost town in the United States
Separ, Iran, a village
Vepar, a demon
Separ, Rapper, rapper from Slovakia (mid-Europe)